Col du Tourmalet  (elevation ) is one of the highest paved mountain passes in the French Pyrenees, in the department of Hautes-Pyrénées. Sainte-Marie-de-Campan is at the foot on the eastern side and the ski station La Mongie two-thirds of the way up. The village of Barèges lies on the western side, above the town of Luz-Saint-Sauveur.

Higher roads in the Pyrenees
The Col du Tourmalet is the highest paved mountain pass in the French Pyrenees second only to the Col de Portet. So in contrast to frequent claims (see for example ), it is neither the highest paved road in the Pyrenees nor the highest paved mountain pass in the  Pyrenees. However, these roads are not mountain passes. Departing directly from the Col du Tourmalet, there is a road to the mountain pass Col de Laquets with an altitude of   However, this road is not paved.

Meaning of "Tourmalet"
Some Frenchmen believe that Tourmalet translates into "bad trip" or "bad detour" because in French Tour translates into "trip" and mal translates into "bad"; however, the correct language to translate from is Gascon, not French, because of the mountain's location in the Gascony region. Then Tour becomes "distance", which is spelled "tur" but pronounced "tour" and mal is translated into "mountain". The translation from Gascon to English then becomes "Distance Mountain".

Tourmalet is also a cheese made from sheep milk produced in these mountains.

Details of the climb 

As with most French climbs, each kilometre mountain pass cycling milestones indicate the height of the summit, the distance to the summit, and the average gradient of the next kilometre. According to PJAMM Cycling's ranking system, the east side is the 24th hardest bike climb in France, and the west is ranked 26th.

From the pass, a rough track leads to the Pic du Midi de Bigorre observatory. Up to the Col de Laquets (elevation ) this track is a dirt and gravel road. The part between the Col de Laquets and the observatory is a steep and narrow hiking track. Some terraces of the observatory can be entered for free from the end of the track. Paying an entrance fee, one can enter the actual observatory and also take the cable car down to La Mongie.

Tour de France 

The Col du Tourmalet is one of the most famous climbs on the Tour de France. It has been included more than any other pass, starting in 1910, when the Pyrenees were introduced. The first rider over was Octave Lapize, who went on to win the general classification in Paris. In 1913, Eugène Christophe broke his fork on the Tourmalet and repaired it himself at a forge in Sainte-Marie-de-Campan.

Up to 2020, the Tour has visited the Col du Tourmalet a total of 87 times. The total includes three stage finishes at the summit and three at La Mongie. Since 1980 it has been ranked hors catégorie, or exceptional. The Vuelta a España has also crossed the pass several times.

The 2010 edition of the Tour included the pass on two consecutive stages, crossing westward on the 16th stage to Pau and eastward on the 17th stage with a finish at the summit.

At the col is a memorial to Jacques Goddet, director of the Tour de France from 1936 to 1987, and a large statue of Octave Lapize gasping for air as he struggles to make the climb. The Souvenir Jacques Goddet prize is awarded for the first rider to cross the Col du Tourmalet summit.

In 2023, the climb will feature in the Tour de France Femmes for the first time, as the queen stage of the race.

Origins in the Tour

The Pyrenees were included in the Tour de France at the insistence of Alphonse Steinès, a colleague of the organiser, Henri Desgrange. He told the story in a book published soon after the event.

Steinès first agreed that the Tour would pay 2,000 francs to clear the Col d'Aubisque, then came back to investigate the Tourmalet. He started at Sainte-Marie-de-Campan with sausage, ham and cheese at the inn opposite the church and arranged to hire a driver called Dupont from Bagnères-de-Bigorre. Dupont and Steinès made it the first 16 km, after which their car came to a stop. Dupont and Steinès started to walk but Dupont turned back after 600m, shouting: "The bears come over from Spain when it snows". Steinès set off. He mistook voices in the darkness for thieves. They were youngsters guarding sheep with their dog. Steinès called to one.

"Son, do you know the Tourmalet well? Could you guide me? I'll give you a gold coin. When we get to the other top, I'll give you another one"

The boy joined him but then turned back.

Steinès rested on a rock. He considered sitting it out until dawn, then realised he'd freeze. He slipped on the icy road, then fell into a stream. He climbed back to the road and again fell in the snow. Exhausted and stumbling, he heard another voice.

"Tell me who goes there or I'll shoot".

"I'm a lost traveller. I've just come across the Tourmalet".

"Oh, it's you, Monsieur Steinès! We were expecting you! We got a phone call at Ste-Marie-de-Campan. Everybody's at Barèges. It's coming on for three o'clock. There are search teams of guides out looking for you".

The organising newspaper, L'Auto, had a correspondent at Barèges, a man called Lanne-Camy. He took him for a bath and provided new clothes.

Steines sent a telegram to Desgrange: "Crossed Tourmalet stop. Very good road stop. Perfectly feasible".

Tour de France stage finishes

Other appearances in Tour de France

Other events
The Col du Tourmalet features in other bicycle races, including the Vuelta a España when it has made excursions into France. It is also on the route of cyclosportive competitions. Thousands of amateur riders make the climb every year and many take documents to have rubber-stamped in the shop at the summit to show they have made it.

See also
 Souvenir Henri Desgrange

References

External links

 Profile on climbbybike.com
 Le col du Tourmalet dans le Tour de France depuis 1947 
 Complete list of leaders over summit 
 Tourmalet website 
 Bagneres de Bigorre - La Mongie website 
 Tourmalet cheese
 The Road to Tourmalet Reconnaissance DVD by Cyclefilm
 Streetview panoramas across the Tour route
 Details of the 1910 tour
 Col du Tourmalet on Google Maps (Tour de France classic climbs)

Mountain passes of Hautes-Pyrénées
Mountain passes of the Pyrenees
Climbs in cycle racing in France
Transport in Occitania (administrative region)